Hira Umer is a Pakistani actress and model. She is better known for her role in ARY Digital's drama serial Mere Humsafar. She is currently playing lead role in TV One's drama serial Dil Bhatkay. In 2021, she paired opposite to Faizan Shaikh for a lead role in Pakistan's first horror-comedy feature film Udham Pathak. She has played supporting roles in Geo Entertainment's Aye Musht-E-Khaak and Hum TV's Parizaad and Dobara. Besides acting, she has appeared in reality shows like The Mazedar Show and Kiya Karega Qazi.

Besides acting, Hira has appeared in several TV commercials for international and local brands and ramp walk for several designers.

Filmography

Television

Film

References

External links 

21st-century Pakistani actresses
Living people
Year of birth missing (living people)